Favela Discos (sometimes referred to as Favela)  is a Portuguese electronic music and experimental music record label founded in 2013 as an artists and intellectuals collective based in Porto. It focuses on experimental music, particularly game piece, as well as transethnicism, free improvisation, fluxus, noise, and vaporwave, among other styles. They are considered among others as the future of portuguese music.

Artists

Batsaykhan
Bezbog
David Ole
Diana Wellington
Dies Lexic
Dora Vieira
Favela Live System
Guadalupe Fiasco
Inês Castanheira
Inês Tartaruga Água
Jomi
José Pinhal Post-Mortem Experience
Judas Triste
Lorr No
Max Potion
Milteto
MotoRotos
Nuno O
Pepe Marcio
Rita Laranja
Sarnadas
Tito Frito
Vasco Da Ganza
Vive Les Cônes
Well
Xavier Paes

Guest artists:
 Drvg Cvltvre
 Evamuss

Past members:
Airlift
Arzemnieks
ASPHALTO
Carocho
Claiana
Das monstrvm
Desgrace
Dizmental
Dj Campanhã
Gabriel Ferrandini & Pedro Sousa
Mada Treku
Moleke$
Os Canto-Esquina
Olumarak
Pai Inválido
Psyderman
SMOP
The 1969 Revolutionary Orgy
úlfr
Xamano
XTRMNTR_VKTR

See also
List of record labels
Fado
sardine

References

External links
 
 Favela Discos Soundcloud
 Favela Discos Discogs
 Favela Discos Bandcamp

Portuguese record labels
Portuguese independent record labels
Electronic dance music record labels
Record labels established in 2013